Broadway Jones is a lost 1917 American silent comedy film directed by Joseph Kaufman and starring George M. Cohan, in his film debut, in a motion picture based on his 1912 play, Broadway Jones.

Though no known copies survive of the film, a 1931 Paramount promotional film, The House That Shadows Built, contains a clip of Cohan which may be from either Broadway Jones or one of two other lost Cohan silent films from around the same time.

Cast
George M. Cohan as Broadway Jones
Marguerite Snow as Josie Richards
Russell Bassett as Andrew Jones
Crauford Kent as Robert Wallace (credited as Crawford Kent)
Ida Darling as Mrs. Gerard
Joseph W. Smiley (credited as Joe Smiley)
John De Lacey

References

External links

Lobby poster
Lobby card cluster (archived)
Portrait (archived)

1917 films
American silent feature films
Lost American films
American films based on plays
Paramount Pictures films
Silent American comedy films
1917 comedy films
Films directed by Joseph Kaufman
American black-and-white films
1917 lost films
Lost comedy films
1910s American films